Rachmat Irianto (born 3 September 1999) is an Indonesian professional footballer who plays as a defender for Liga 1 club Persib Bandung and the Indonesian national team. Mainly a central defender, he can also play as a full-back or a defensive midfielder. He is the son of former footballer, Bejo Sugiantoro and was named as a tribute to Bejo's compatriot at Persebaya, Eri Irianto.

Club career

Persebaya Surabaya
Irianto in 2017, at the age of 17, joined his hometown club Persebaya Surabaya, where his father works as an assistant coach, and helped the club to win a promotion from Liga 2. He made his Indonesian Liga 1 first-team debut for Persebaya Surabaya when he was part of the starting lineup of a 2018 Liga 1 match against Barito Putera on 8 April 2018, in which Persebaya lost.

On 21 July 2019, Irianto scored his first league goal in the 2019 Liga 1 for Persebaya in a 1–1 draw over TIRA-Persikabo at the Gelora Bung Tomo Stadium. 
He became a regular feature at the backline in the 2019 Liga 1 season. In less than four years since his entry and after the departure of several senior players in 2021, he became the captain of the senior team at the young age of 21.

Persib Bandung
Irianto was signed for Persib Bandung to play in Liga 1 in the 2022–23 season. On 24 July 2022, Irianto made his league debut by starting in a 2–2 draw against Bhayangkara and he also scored his first goal for the team, he scored in the 42nd minute at Wibawa Mukti Stadium.

International career
On 31 May 2017, Irianto made his debut against Brazil U20 in the 2017 Toulon Tournament in France. Irianto is also one of the players who strengthened the Indonesia U19 team that won third place in the 2018 AFC U-19 Championship.

Irianto was part of the Indonesia team that won silver in the 2019 Southeast Asian Games. He received a call to join the senior Indonesian national football team in May 2021 and was projected to captain the team in official matches. He earned his first senior cap in a 25 May 2021 friendly match in Dubai against Afghanistan. On 9 December 2021, he scored his first goal for Indonesia with scored a brace in the team's opening 2020 AFF Championship against Cambodia.

On 8 June 2022, Irianto scored a goal in a 2023 AFC Asian Cup qualification match against Kuwait, in a 2-1 win.

Career statistics

Club

International

International goals
International under-23 goals

International senior goals

Honours

Club 
Persebaya Surabaya
 Liga 2: 2017
 East Java Governor Cup: 2020

International 
Indonesia U-19
 AFF U-19 Youth Championship third place: 2017
Indonesia U-23
 AFF U-22 Youth Championship: 2019
 Southeast Asian Games  Silver medal: 2019
 Southeast Asian Games  Bronze medal: 2021
Indonesia
 AFF Championship runner-up: 2020

References

External links
 
 

1999 births
Living people
Sportspeople from Surabaya
Sportspeople from East Java
Indonesian footballers
Association football defenders
Persebaya Surabaya players
Persib Bandung players
Liga 1 (Indonesia) players
Indonesia youth international footballers
Indonesia international footballers
Competitors at the 2019 Southeast Asian Games
Southeast Asian Games silver medalists for Indonesia
Southeast Asian Games medalists in football
Competitors at the 2021 Southeast Asian Games
21st-century Indonesian people